Events from the year 1993 in Finland

Incumbents 
 President: Mauno Koivisto
 Prime Minister: Esko Aho
 Speaker: Ilkka Suominen

Events 

 Finland in the Eurovision Song Contest 1993
 List of number-one singles of 1993 (Finland)
 The Constitutional Right Party dissolved.
 Television series debuted:
 Gladiaattorit
 Anteeksi kuinka?
 Iltalypsy

Establishments 

 Agronic Oy was established in Haapavesi.
 Eläkeläiset
 Deuteronomium (band)

Sports 

 Finish people were in
 1993 World Amateur Boxing Championships
 1993 Men's European Volleyball Championship
 1993 European Figure Skating Championships

Births 
11 February - Saana Saarteinen, tennis player
7 March - Samu Perhonen, ice hockey player
7 June - Miro Aaltonen, ice hockey player

References 

 
1990s in Finland
Finland
Finland
Years of the 20th century in Finland